Carbonemys cofrinii is an extinct giant podocnemidid turtle known from the Middle Paleocene Cerrejón Formation of the Cesar-Ranchería Basin in northeastern Colombia. The formation is dated at around 60 to 57 million years ago, starting at about five million years after the KT extinction event.

Discovery 
In 2005, the holotype specimen was discovered in the Cerrejón coal mine by a North Carolina State University doctoral student named Edwin Cadena.

Paleoecology 
The jaws of Carbonemys were massive and would be powerful enough to eat crocodilians, that were abundant in the first neotropical forest of the Cerrejón Formation.  This turtle coexisted with the giant boid (constrictor), Titanoboa.

References 
 

Podocnemididae
Paleocene turtles
Paleocene reptiles of South America
Peligran
Itaboraian
Paleogene Colombia
Fossils of Colombia
Cerrejón Formation
Prehistoric turtle genera
Fossil taxa described in 2012